The South Telford Heritage Trail is a circular, waymarked walking route that passes by forty-nine heritage sites in the English town of Telford.

The route

The trail begins and ends in Telford Town Park and passes through the parishes of Stirchley & Brookside, Madeley, Dawley Hamlets and the Ironbridge Gorge.  The route follows the remains of a network of canals, tramways, railways, coal-mines, brickworks, potteries and ironworks that once flourished in the area.  The trail can be walked in its entirety in 5–6 hours.

History

Telford was established as a new town in 1968. Within its boundaries it incorporated many old settlements and communities, some dating back to the Domesday Book. During the 18th and 19th centuries the area was noted for its coal mines, iron works, china factories and brickworks.

By the beginning of the 20th century much of this industry had declined and by the 1960s, what remained was a legacy of uncapped mineshafts, derelict buildings, abandoned quarries, spoil heaps and pit mounds. The development of Telford and thoughtful landscaping has removed or hidden many of these scars. However, throughout the area of South Telford there remains a wealth of heritage sites. These include the canals, railways, mines, ironworks, houses and fine buildings associated with the area's industrial past. Many of these heritage sites are easily missed by the casual walker and their contributions to the rich history of the area are less well known.

Aims of the Trail

The aim of the South Telford Heritage Trail is to bring attention the area's history by offering a self-guided walking route that links known and lesser known heritage sites within South Telford and to provide information about each site.

The Heritage Sites

The forty-nine heritage sites that the trail passes are as follows:

These sites also act as trail waypoints.

Funding

The trail was funded by grants from the Heritage Lottery Fund and Stirchley & Brookside Parish Council.

References

External links
The South Telford Heritage Trail

Tourist attractions in Shropshire
Telford
Ironbridge Gorge
Urban heritage trails